Nord Kanem is a department of Kanem Region in Chad. It was created by Ordinance No. 002 / PR / 08, on February 19, 2008.  Its capital is Nokou.

Subdivisions 
The department of Nord Kanem is divided into 4 sub-prefectures:

 Nokou
 Rig Rig
 Ziguey
 Ntiona (also spelled Nthiona)

Administration 
List of administrators :

 Prefect of North Kanem (since 2008)
 • Abdraman Kerim Gouri (since June 2015)

References 

Departments of Chad